Tresor Kangambu (born 8 April 1987), also known as Mohammed Tresor Abdullah, is a Qatari footballer  who currently plays as a right winger. He converted to Islam on 17 December 2014 and adopted the name Mohammed Abdullah, the religion he used to follow at youth.

He was born and raised in the Democratic Republic of Congo (then Zaire), but moved to Qatar early in his career, and became a naturalized citizen. He received a call-up to the Qatar national team shortly after when head coach Djamel Belmadi announced his presence in the team's 2015 AFC Asian Cup squad.

Career
Abdullah started his playing career in Al Markhiya in 2009, but moved to Lekhwiya a year later helping them win the 2010–11 Qatar Stars League. Shortly after, he was transferred to Al Wakrah. He made his debut on September 16 against his former club in a 1–0 loss.

References

External links

Futbol-talentos.es
Zerozerofootball.com

1987 births
Living people
Qatari footballers
Qatar international footballers
Democratic Republic of the Congo footballers
Democratic Republic of the Congo expatriate footballers
Al-Markhiya SC players
Lekhwiya SC players
Al-Wakrah SC players
Al Ahli SC (Doha) players
Umm Salal SC players
Expatriate footballers in Qatar
Qatar Stars League players
Qatari Second Division players
2015 AFC Asian Cup players
Converts to Islam
Democratic Republic of the Congo Muslims
Naturalised citizens of Qatar
Association football wingers